Amity Law School, Delhi is a law school in Noida.

Rankings 

The Amity Law School, Delhi was ranked third in Outlook Indias "Top 30 Private Law Colleges In India" of 2022.

References

External links 
 

Guru Gobind Singh Indraprastha University
Law schools in Delhi
Educational institutions established in 1999
1999 establishments in Delhi